Sophie Alouf-Bertot (born in 1945), is a Belgian graphic designer, painter and former teacher living and working in Brussels.

Education 
Sophie Alouf first studied at the Institut Sainte Marie in Brussels and after that joined the graphic arts department of the National Superior School for Architecture and Visual Arts La Cambre (ENSAAV), where she got training in Luc Van Malderen workshop who was also the head of the department at the time. Typography was taught by Fernand Baudin. She has mentioned it being easy to settle into the world of graphic design, because Sophie's mother has been one of the first students at La cambre in that particular field and was also teaching graphic communication there. Her specialty was everything that concerned the third dimension – shop window design etc. Sophie Alouf-Bertot obtained her diploma in 1969.

Design practice 
After graduating La Cambre Sophie Alouf-Bertot started working at Elizabeth Arden’s where her responsibilities included designing shop windows in the Benelux countries. Despite financial security in the company after about a year and a half she decided to leave Elizabeth Arden’s and set up her own design studio together with her husband Sami Alouf who had also studied at La Cambre and where they met. After graduating Sami, who comes from Lebanon, had gone to Beirut to open a studio. In 1970 they got married and Sophie and Sami opened a workshop together named “S+S Alouf design”.  

In their collaboration Sophie has a predilection for bright colors, contrasts and illustrative work, whereas Sami specializes in the creation of logotypes, typography and anything connected with corporate identity programs.  Although they have specific roles in their practice and sometimes one of them exclusively deals with the creation, their preferred approach is to make the final decisions for the finished version of the design together. 

One of their first clients was Woluwe and Westland Shopping Centers that commissioned them to create graphic identity as well as posters for thematic exhibitions that were organized every two to three months. That resulted in designing about 200 posters of a luxurious finish as they used screen printing technique to make them. Those posters were done in small runs which made this printing method possible. 

Sophie Alouf-Bertot and Sami Alouf have designed orientation systems for several institutions. Their conviction was that orientation systems must not only be clear and easy to read but also attractive, therefore one should not limit the color scheme to the conventional black and white. However, the color, in their opinion, must be used in the primary intention of emphasizing the visual information not exaggerated creativeness for its own sake. They believe that the task of a graphic designer is to take into account Individual characters of every project and building, not to use stereotyped signage.

In the shopping center in Nivelles they created orientation system that served simultaneously as a trade-mark, using basic elements N and an arrow. Two illuminated panels made out of those arrows paced at the main entrance made it distinct from the entrance doors for the staff. The same arrow shaped panels guided customers from the parking area towards the main entrance above which sat an illuminated shop sign of 26 feet. Inside the building a number or arrows arranged one above another created an impression of a street crossing. 

For the “Universite Libre de Bruxelles (ULB)” they took another approach. They selected a different color related to each of department which then guided the students and visitors through the campus. The color code was supplemented by about 40 pictographs. 

They also designed orientation system for the festival hall of the “Palais des Beaux-Arts” in Brussels built by Victor Horta. There they adapted the style of the building by using enamelled steel plates of the same beige color as the walls of the building and bright green or bright blue letters and arrows thereby creating a distinguished, bright and friendly look.

Other clients of "S+S design" include the Design Center in Brussels, The Commission of the European Communities Culture and Communication Directorate and Media program as well as international projects for hotels such as hotel chain “Sheraton Management Corporation” (Starwood) in Africa, Europe, United States and Middle East for which they designed trademarks and identities - menu cards, signage etc.

In the interview with Sara De Bondt for the exhibition at the Design museum Ghent in 2019 Sophie Alouf-Bertot describes her working method. She uses cutting and pasting technique for designing her posters. Clippings glued on a see-through cellophane sheets allow her to experiment with color, shapes and composition until the desired result is made. After the poster image is done, she would add fake texts to design the layout approaching it as a total image not a separate text and picture. She also uses painting which gives her even more freedom.

Teaching 
Sophie Alouf-Bertot devoted a large part of her professional life to teaching. From 1979 to 1992 she was teaching Graphic Arts in the Graphic Arts Workshop at the Institut St. Luc in Brussels and afterwards been the head of this department from 1992 to 2010. Meanwhile after being invited to be a jury and filling for someone else’s place several times at ENSAAV (La Cambre) Typography department in 1988 she started giving lectures at Communication through image and color and continued to do that until 2004.

Group exhibitions and catalogues 
With the works of her studio and her paintings Sophie Alouf-Bertot has participated in several group exhibitions in Brussels, Kortrijk, Beirut, Metz, Amsterdam, Luxembourg, Paris and Athens. Those include:

 1976 October 15th till November 21st Exhibition and the catalogue of Milton Glaser Exhibition at the Royal Museums of Fine Arts of Belgium in Brussels.
 1978 International Poster Biennale in Warsaw.
 1978 Biennale of Graphic Design in Brno.
 1980 April 4th till May 4th exhibition “Poster Art in Belgium form 1900 – 1980” at Galerie CGER in Brussels and in the catalogue with a poster of the Woluwe Shopping Center.
 2012 group exhibition of paintings in the Brussels Seed Factory.
 2013 “75 ans de Spirou” in the Brussels Seed Factory.
 2019 October 25th till 2020 February 16th “Off the Grid” – Belgian graphic design exhibition at the Design Museum Gent.

Several of “S+S Alouf design” studio posters are in the collection of the Royal Museums of Fine Arts of Belgium.

Painting 

At 2020 Sophie Alouf-Bertot dedicates large part of her time to her passion painting.

Sources

References 

Belgian graphic designers
1945 births
Living people